Necro may refer to:
 necro-, the Greek prefix meaning death
 Necromancy, a type of magic
 Necrophilia, the sexual attraction to corpses
 Necropolis, a large ancient cemetery
 Necro (Street Fighter), a character from the Street Fighter III series
 Necro, a transdimensional demon of darkness from Brave Saga 2.

Music
 The Necros, band
 Necro (rapper) (born 1976), an American rapper